"Bankrobber" is a song by English punk rock band The Clash. The song was not released on any of their studio albums, instead appearing on their compilation Black Market Clash. Upon its 1980 release as a single (initially available in the UK on import only) it peaked at number 12 on the UK Singles Chart, and at number 14 on both the Irish Singles Chart and the New Zealand Singles Chart.

Young Ian Brown and Pete Garner, later of The Stone Roses, were in attendance at the studio recording session of this single. According to Brown, having heard a rumour that the Clash were recording in Manchester, he and Garner were walking through the city centre when they overheard Topper Headon playing the drums at the city's Pluto Studios: Headon subsequently emerged from the studio and invited the pair in. The full account of this incident is in John Robb's Stone Roses and the Resurrection of British Pop.

The Clash filmed a low-budget video for the song, depicting members of the band recording the song in the studio, interspersed with Clash roadies Baker and Johnny Green wearing bandanas over their faces, performing a bank heist in Lewisham. During the filming, Baker and Green were stopped and questioned by the police, who thought they were genuine.

Track listing
 7" vinyl
 "Bankrobber" (The Clash) – 4:36
 "Rockers Galore... UK Tour" (Mikey Dread) – 4:42

Personnel
 Joe Strummer - lead vocal
 Mick Jones - sound effects, guitars
 Paul Simonon - bass
 Topper Headon - drums
 Mick Gallagher - ARP synthesizer, piano
 Mikey Dread - backing vocal, production

Robber Dub
"Robber Dub" is the dub version of "Bankrobber". It was to be included in the 12" single for "Bankrobber", but the label decided not to release the 12" single.  The song can be found on their 1980 compilation album Black Market Clash, combined with "Bankrobber" as a 6:16 track, and also on the 1994 compilation album Super Black Market Clash, as a 4:42 stand alone track.

Rockers Galore... UK Tour
"Rockers Galore... UK Tour" is a reworking of "Bankrobber" with Mikey Dread singing new lyrics about touring with the Clash. It is not "Robber Dub" which lacks the Dread vocal and lyrics.  "Rockers Galore" is also featured on their 2006 compilation album Singles Box.

Appearances
Also, "Bankrobber" is featured in Guy Ritchie's 2008 film, Rocknrolla.  It is sung alternately by the older 'Johnny Quid', portrayed by British actor Toby Kebbell, in his dingy flat, and by the younger 'John Cole' in the company of his cruel stepfather, the London mob boss Lenny Cole.

Cover versions
Audioweb recorded a rock/reggae cover in 1996 that reached number 19 in the UK Singles Chart.

Chumbawamba's 2005 album A Singsong and a Scrap features an a cappella cover version of the song.

Tom Morello covered the song acoustically for a Joe Strummer tribute in 2020.

Charts

Notes

References

Sources

 
 
 
 
 
 
 
 
 Related news articles:
 
 
 

Songs about criminals
1980 singles
The Clash songs
Reggae songs
Songs written by Joe Strummer
1980 songs
Songs written by Mick Jones (The Clash)
CBS Records singles